Jean Leising (born January 10, 1949) is an American politician from the State of Indiana. She is a Republican member of the Indiana Senate, representing the 42nd District from 1989 to 1996 and from 2008 to the present. She was Assistant Majority Whip from 1992 to 1996.

Career before politics
Leising was born on January 10, 1949, in Batesville, Indiana. She graduated from Sunman Consolidated High School in 1966. Leising is a farm owner, haven taken over operation of the farm after he first husband died in an accident. Leising is also a travel agent and retired nurse.

Political career

State Senate tenure
Leising first entered the state Senate in 1989. In the 1990s, Leising authored legislation requiring that women undergo a waiting period before seeking an abortion in Indiana.

For nearly a decade, Leising has annually introduced into the state Senate a bill to require elementary schools in Indiana to teach cursive handwriting; the proposals have been unsuccessful.

Leising has chaired the state Senate's Agriculture Committee. In 2015, Leising introduced legislation that would prohibit local governments (such as counties, municipalities, and townships) from placing restrictions on building livestock structure, including concentrated animal feeding operations, which in some cases present substantial environmental risks and odors, such as those arising from manure lagoons. Environmental groups and local government officials opposed the legislation, which they viewed as an attempted power grab by the state's agribusiness lobby. The proposed "preemption" provision did not pass.

Also in 2015, Leising was one of five Republican state senators who asked state Attorney General Greg Zoeller to investigate the animal welfare group Humane Society of the United States. The Republican lawmakers accused the group of deceptive fundraising practices; the Human Society responded that the letter was an "obvious political attack from politicians who stand in the way of protecting animals from captive hunts, puppy mills, and factory farms."

In 2012, when the legislature was considering legislation to ban smoking in most indoor public spaces, Leising proposed an amendment to exempt nursing homes, group homes, mental health and veterans facilities from the ban.

Leising was the chair of an interim study committee that looked into the possible legalization of the use of cannabidiol oil in Indiana for treating seizures in children; in 2016, she sponsored a bill to immunize Indiana physicians from prosecution for conducting trials studying the effectiveness of CBD oil as a potential seizure treatment.

In 2020, Leising was one of four senators to vote against an anti-distracted driving bill to prohibit the use of handheld telecommunications devices (such as mobile phones) while driving a car; the bill passed 43–4.

Unsuccessful congressional runs
Leising was the Republican candidate challenging Democratic congressman Lee H. Hamilton in the 1994 and 1996 elections for Indiana's 9th congressional district, but was defeated on both occasions. In 1994, the year of the Republican Revolution, Hamilton only narrowly won, but his margin of victory in 1996 was substantially wider. In 1998, after Hamilton decided to retire, Leising made a third bid for the congressional seat, challenging Democratic nominee Baron Hill for the primarily rural congressional seat. Hill defeated Leising in an upset victory.

Personal life
Leising lives in Oldenburg. Her first husband died in an accident, and she subsequently remarried. Leising has three children. She is Roman Catholic.

References

External links
Official profile from the Indiana Senate website
Jean Leising at Ballotpedia

1949 births
Living people
Republican Party Indiana state senators
Women state legislators in Indiana
People from Batesville, Indiana
21st-century American politicians
21st-century American women politicians
20th-century American politicians
20th-century American women politicians
Candidates in the 1994 United States elections
Candidates in the 1996 United States elections
Candidates in the 1998 United States elections